The  is the highest-ranking officer within the Japanese conservative party, the Liberal Democratic Party. Due to the dominance of the LDP in Japanese politics, all except two (Yohei Kono and Sadakazu Tanigaki) have also been the prime minister of Japan.

Elections 
To be a candidate for the president, one must be a LDP member of the National Diet and must receive at least 20 nominations from other LDP members of the National Diet. The LDP selects its leader via a two-round election involving both LDP members of the Diet and dues-paying party members from across Japan. In the first round, all LDP members of the Diet cast one vote while party member votes are translated proportionally into votes equaling the other half of the total ballots. If any candidate wins a majority (over 50%) of votes in the first round, that candidate is elected President.

If no candidate receives a majority of votes in the first round, a runoff is held immediately between the top two candidates. In the runoff, all Diet members vote again while the 47 prefectural chapters of the LDP get one vote each, with the result of the latter votes determined using the first round results of party members in each prefecture. The candidate who wins the most votes in the runoff is then elected President.

The party's secretary general can decide to organise the election with the rule of the second round only.

List

Reference 

Liberal Democratic Party (Japan)
Liberal Democratic Party